Kheïreddine Madoui (born March 27, 1977 in Sétif) is an Algerian football former player and the current manager of CS Constantine.

Career
As a player, he spent his entire career between his hometown club of ES Sétif and CR Belouizdad. He also had 12 caps and 3 goals for the Algerian National Team.

In 2005, he had to end up his active career due to a severe leg injury with only 28 years of age.

Five years later, in summer 2010 he became assistant coach of his hometown club ES Sétif, until he was designated as head coach of the team in December 2013.

In 2014, Madoui became the youngest ever coach to lead his team to the final of an African continental competition after guiding ES Sétif to the 2014 CAF Champions League final.

On 3 May 2015, Madoui announced he is stepping down as coach of ES Setif at the end of the current season.

On 24 May 2018, Egyptian club Ismaily SC announced Madoui as the new manager, only a day after former manager Pedro Barny was announced to have left the club.

On 11 January 2020, Saudi Arabian club Al-Khaleej announced Madoui as the new manager. On 6 October 2020, Saudi Arabian club Al-Shoulla announced Madoui as the new manager.

On 13 February 2021, MC Oran announced Madoui as new manager.

Honours

Manager
 ES Sétif
 CAF Champions League (1): 2014
 Algerian Ligue Professionnelle 1 (2): 2014–15, 2016–17
 CAF Super Cup (1): 2015
 Algerian Super Cup (2): 2015, 2017

References

External links
 
 Kheïreddine Madoui at Footballdatabase

1977 births
Algeria international footballers
Algeria under-23 international footballers
Algerian football managers
Algerian footballers
CR Belouizdad players
ES Sétif players
Expatriate football managers in Saudi Arabia
Expatriate football managers in Tunisia
Living people
Footballers from Sétif
ES Sétif managers
Al-Wehda Club (Mecca) managers
Competitors at the 1997 Mediterranean Games
Association football midfielders
Étoile Sportive du Sahel managers
MC Oran managers
Mediterranean Games competitors for Algeria
Al-Shoulla FC managers
Kuwait Premier League managers
Expatriate football managers in Kuwait
Algerian expatriate sportspeople in Kuwait
Algerian expatriate sportspeople in Egypt
Expatriate football managers in Egypt
Ismaily SC managers
Khaleej FC managers
Egyptian Premier League managers
Algerian expatriate sportspeople in Saudi Arabia
MO Béjaïa managers
Saudi Professional League managers
Saudi First Division League managers
Algerian expatriate sportspeople in Tunisia
21st-century Algerian people